Steven Ogg is a Canadian actor. He is known for playing Trevor Philips in the 2013 video game Grand Theft Auto V and Simon in The Walking Dead, and has also appeared in Better Call Saul, Westworld, The Tick, and Snowpiercer.

Early life
Ogg was born in Edmonton, Alberta, and raised in Calgary. He began his acting career in a film for the National Film Board of Canada, before working in various theater productions. He was focused on pursuing a career in sports, but an injury prevented him from doing so.

Career 
After moving to New York City, he began acting in television shows such as Law & Order and Third Watch, in addition to some theater work and voice acting.

After taking a break from acting to build a house, he was hired by Rockstar Games as the voice and motion capture artist for Trevor Philips in their 2013 video game Grand Theft Auto V. His character was critically acclaimed and he received numerous award nominations as a result. In February 2014, he received an award on the 3rd Annual New York Videogame Critics Circle Awards for Best Overall Acting in a Game. Ogg later reprised his role in the 2016 YouTube short film GTA VR.

In The Walking Dead season 6 finale, he made his debut as Simon, a member of the Saviors and one of the main antagonists in season 7. Ogg also portrayed Rebus in the HBO series Westworld, and provides the voice of Professor Venomous, in Cartoon Network's animated series OK K.O.! Let's Be Heroes. In 2019, Ogg portrayed Flexon in the second season of the 2016 series The Tick.

Ogg noted in an interview that he is aware of being typecast as "the crazy guy, the unpredictable guy", though he did not mind this if it led to steady work. He admitted, however, that he would ideally like to explore "different characters [and] different worlds", like his role as a father in the 2019 drama The Short History of the Long Road.

In 2022 he appeared in Dan Mangan's music video for "Fire Escape", playing a personification of Mangan's self-critical inner voice.

Filmography

Film

Television

Video games

Web

Accolades

References

External links

 Official website
 

Living people
Male actors from Edmonton
Canadian expatriates in the United States
Canadian male film actors
Canadian male video game actors
Canadian male voice actors
Canadian male television actors
Male motion capture actors
20th-century Canadian male actors
21st-century Canadian male actors
Year of birth missing (living people)